Villeperdue is a commune in the Indre-et-Loire department in central France. The Château de Boisbonnard is located in the commune.

Population

See also
Communes of the Indre-et-Loire department

References

Communes of Indre-et-Loire